Hoki is a Japanese surname. Notable people with the surname include:

, Japanese badminton player

Japanese-language surnames